Salty Tour is a South Korean television program that airs on tvN.

Season 1 aired on every Saturday at 22:30 (KST) beginning November 25, 2017 to June 1, 2019.

Season 2, named More Salty Tour, began on June 17, 2019 and broadcast timing changed to Mondays at 23:00 (KST).

The show had a hiatus after the episode on March 16, 2020 due to the COVID-19 pandemic, which made travelling and filming for the show difficult. On June 1, it was confirmed that filming for the show had resumed. The program continued from June 30 and broadcast timing changed to Tuesdays at 19:40 (KST). The last episode was aired on August 4.

Program

Season 1
For every destination, 2 or 3 of the cast members (or invited guest(s)) are assigned as 1-day tour guides and are given the same budget per person. There are also scenarios where cast members and/or guests work together as the day's tour guides. With a fixed budget, the tour guide(s) for each day have to attempt to provide a best vacation experience. The judging of the 1-day tours will be done by the remaining cast members and invited guests, based on the food, places of interest, accommodation and a temporary criteria (which changes for every destination) for each day. The winning tour guide can get to enjoy a Small Luxury that each of the tour guide wants to enjoy after being the winning tour guide of the destination.

Season 2 (More Salty Tour)
This season sticks to the same format and rules of Season 1, which emphasised on 1-day tours under tight budgets. However, a new rule is added in this season. For every destination, whoever are assigned as 1-day tour guides can each choose a luxury spot (defined as one that is not the least expensive, but gives more satisfaction), either for food, place of interest or accommodation. The cast members and invited guest(s) have to complete a mission from the production team to get to go for the luxury spot, if not they will have to go for the cheapest alternative of it, arranged by the production team. The winning tour guide(s) for every destination will get a golden badge.

A new format was introduced starting from the 9th tour. 2 (or 2 teams of) tour guides will battle against each other, and the remaining cast members and invited guest(s) will each choose to follow 1, hence 2 different tours in the same destination are held on the same day. In the middle of the day, all are gathered for an evaluation, where the remaining cast members and guest(s) can either continue to follow the same tour guide each of them chose at first or change to be guided under the other tour guide if he/she is not satisfied with the previous part of the tour.

Domestic Version
The sub-title beginning episode 116 is Wise Online Travel (슬기로운랜선여행). The domestic version sticks to the original concept of the season.

Cast
 Park Myung-soo (Episode 1–121)
 Yeo Hoe-hyun (Episode 1–6)
 Kim Saeng-min (Episode 1-18)
 Jung Joon-young (Episode 1-66)
 Park Na-rae (Episode 1-69)
 Moon Se-yoon (Episode 25–78)
 Heo Kyung-hwan (Episode 28–78)
 Han Hye-jin (Episode 79-115)
 Lee Yong-jin (Episode 79-115)
 Kyuhyun (Super Junior) (Episode 79-121)
 Kim Jun-ho (Episode 111–121)
 So Yi-hyun (Episode 116–121)

Changes to the cast
Yeo Hoe-hyun has stepped down from the show after the episode on December 30, 2017 due to his filming schedule. Since then, the show would invite guest(s) to go on tours together with the cast.

On April 3, 2018 it was announced that Kim Saeng-min has stepped down from the show following his recent apology for a past sexual harassment incident. There is no episode on April 7, in order for the production crew to re-edit the remaining of the Taiwan tour, which was already recorded before the news broke out.

On May 23, 2018 it was confirmed that Moon Se-yoon and Heo Kyung-hwan would join the show's permanent cast, with the former joining from the episode on May 26 and the latter to join from the episode on June 16.

On February 26, 2019 it was confirmed by tvN that Park Na-rae would be leaving the show after the Hong Kong-Macau tour episodes, with the possibility of having a new fixed cast member to replace her.

On March 12, 2019, it was confirmed by tvN that Jung Joon-young would step down from the show due to his involvement in the Burning Sun scandal. He would be edited out for the episodes that he has already recorded.

On May 8, 2019 tvN confirmed that the show would go into Season 2, with only Park Myung-soo from Season 1 to remain and Han Hye-jin, Lee Yong-jin and Kyuhyun (Super Junior) to join in as the fixed cast of the show.

On February 17, 2020 tvN confirmed that Kim Jun-ho would join the show's permanent cast, starting from the episode on the same day.

On June 10, 2020, tvN confirmed that Han Hye-jin has stepped down from the show, and So Yi-hyun would join the show's permanent cast. It is also assumed that Lee Yong-jin has stepped down from the show.

Episodes (Season 1)

2017

2018

2019

Episodes (Season 2 — More Salty Tour)

2019

2020

Ratings
In the ratings below, the highest rating for the show will be in red, and the lowest rating for the show will be in blue each year.

Season 1
2017

2018

2019

Season 2
2019

2020

 Note that the show airs on a cable channel (pay TV), which plays part in its slower uptake and relatively small audience share when compared to programs broadcast (FTA) on public networks such as KBS, SBS, MBC or EBS.
NR rating means "not reported".
 TNmS have stopped publishing their rating report from June 2018.

Notes

References

External links
  

South Korean reality television series
2017 South Korean television series debuts
2020s South Korean television series
Korean-language television shows
South Korean variety television shows
South Korean travel television series
Television series by SM C&C
Television productions suspended due to the COVID-19 pandemic